Addagal may refer to:

 Addagal (Chik Ballapur), a village in Karnataka, India
 Addagal (Srinivaspur), a village in Karnataka, India